Acrolophus torta is a moth of the family Acrolophidae. It is found in Peru.

References

Moths described in 1922
torta